For the results of the New Caledonia national football team, see:
New Caledonia national football team results (1951–1999)
New Caledonia national football team results (2000–present)